Shane L. Evans is an American businesswoman. She is the co-founder and president of Massage Heights. Evans began working in sales and marketing at the age of 16. Starting at the age of 19, Evans experienced back pain that was not resolved by chiropractors. In 2004, Evans and her husband, Wayne, cofounded Massage Heights in San Antonio. She serves as president and chief operating officer. In December 2013, Evans was featured in an episode of Undercover Boss.  , the Massage Heights expanded to 160 locations.

References

External links

Businesspeople from San Antonio
21st-century American businesswomen
21st-century American businesspeople
American women company founders
American company founders
American chief operating officers
Living people
Year of birth missing (living people)
Place of birth missing (living people)